The chestnut-backed antshrike (Thamnophilus palliatus) is a species of bird in the family Thamnophilidae. It is found in Bolivia, Brazil, and Peru.

Its natural habitats are subtropical or tropical moist lowland forest, subtropical or tropical moist montane forest, and heavily degraded former forest.

References

chestnut-backed antshrike
Birds of the Amazon Basin
Birds of Bolivia
Birds of the Peruvian Andes
Birds of the Atlantic Forest
chestnut-backed antshrike
Taxonomy articles created by Polbot